Paul David Washer (born 1961) is an American Protestant Christian evangelist with a Calvinist theology affiliated with the Southern Baptist Convention.

Biography

Washer reports converting to Christianity while studying at the University of Texas at Austin to become an oil and gas lawyer. He moved to Peru and served there as a missionary for 10 years. In 1988, while in Peru, Washer founded the HeartCry Missionary Society to support indigenous missionaries witnessing to people of their own cultures. As of 2017, the organization supported 238 missionary families in 41 countries.

Washer later returned to the United States, and has resided in Radford, Virginia, since 2010, where he continues as the missions director of HeartCry.

Washer is sometimes identified as part of the New Calvinism movement, although he has expressed concerns with this movement.

In 2002, Washer preached a "shocking youth message" in which he suggested that most of his "Christian" audience could end up in hell. As of 2021, the YouTube video of the talk has received more than 3 million views. Washer appeared in the 2018 documentary American Gospel: Christ Alone, in which he said "In other religions, you get to heaven by being good, by earning it..." Rick Pidcock argues that this statement misrepresents non-Christian religions.

In 2017, Washer suffered a non-fatal heart attack.

Books

References

Further reading

External links 
 HeartCry Missionary Society
 
 

1961 births
American clergy
American Protestant missionaries
Christian writers
Southern Baptists
Southwestern Baptist Theological Seminary alumni
Living people
University of Texas at Austin alumni
American male writers
Protestant missionaries in the United States
People from Radford, Virginia
Baptists from Virginia